Malleostemon is a genus of flowering plants in the myrtle family Myrtaceae, described as a genus in 1983, by John Green The entire genus is endemic to Western Australia.

Species
Malleostemon costatus Rye & Trudgen
Malleostemon decipiens (W.Fitzg.) Trudgen
 Malleostemon hursthousei (W.Fitzg.) J.W.Green
 Malleostemon microphyllus Rye & Trudgen
 Malleostemon minilyaensis J.W.Green
 Malleostemon nephroideus Rye
 Malleostemon nerrenensis Rye & Trudgen
 Malleostemon pedunculatus J.W.Green
 Malleostemon peltiger (S.Moore) J.W.Green
 Malleostemon pustulatus Rye
 Malleostemon roseus (E.Pritz.) J.W.Green
 Malleostemon tuberculatus (E.Pritz.) J.W.Green
 Malleostemon uniflorus Rye

References

 
Myrtaceae genera
Endemic flora of Western Australia